Valico di San Fermo also called Valico di San Clemente (1129 m) is a mountain pass between province of Genoa and province of Alessandria in Italy.

It connects the Borbera and Vobbia valley, linking Cabella Ligure (Piedmont) and Vobbia (Liguria) in the south.

See also
 List of highest paved roads in Europe
 List of mountain passes

References

San Fermo
San Fermo
Mountain passes of the Apennines